The Rolls-Royce Silver Spirit is a full-size luxury car produced by Rolls-Royce Motors, in Crewe, England, from 1980 to 1997. It was the first model in the SZ series. The Silver Spur is a long-wheelbase version of the Silver Spirit, produced from 1980 to 2000. It was the first car to feature a retractable Spirit of Ecstasy: the spring-loaded mascot sank into the radiator shell if dislodged from its position.

Mark I

The Silver Spirit was introduced by Rolls-Royce in 1980 as the first of a new generation of company models. It formed the basis for the Flying Spur, Silver Dawn, Touring Limousine, Park Ward, and Bentley Mulsanne/Eight series. The Spirit/Spur carried over the basic design of the Silver Shadow, its 6.75 L L410 V8 engine and GM-sourced THM400 3-speed automatic gearbox, and similarly styled unitary bodywork manufactured at Pressed Steel. The Spur/Spirit continued the Silver Shadow's emphasis on ride quality by utilizing its hydropneumatic self-levelling suspension, modified with Girling automatic hydraulic ride height control system and gas-charged shock absorbers. Sealed beam headlamps were fitted in the United States due to longstanding regulations, while European laws allowed for the fitment of more modern composite units.

Mark II

The Silver Spirit II and Silver Spur II were refinements of the original models, introduced at the 1989 Frankfurt Motor Show. Suspension design saw the most change, with "Automatic Ride Control" introduced, a fully automatic system that adjusted dampers at all four wheels in real time. Other updates included the adoption of ABS and fuel injection as standard for all models and markets. The last Mark I Silver Spirit/Spur was chassis no KCH27798, with Mark II cars starting with 29001. The fuel injection system was now Bosch's MK-Motronic.

Originally retaining the three-speed Turbo Hydramatic GM400 transmission from earlier Spirits/Spurs, a four-speed unit (the GM 4L80E) was introduced in the winter of 1991.

Exterior and interior changes were minimal, with a considerably smaller steering wheel and two additional ventilation outlets added to the fascia mildly modernising the look up front.

Mark III

The Silver Spirit III and Silver Spur III were introduced in 1993, featuring engine improvements and some cosmetic updates. A new design of intake manifold and cylinder heads increased power output. The parameters of the semi-active suspension system were modified so that shock absorbers would default into "soft" ride mode when they wore out (rather than "hard" in the previous Mark II, noticeably impacting ride quality). Dual airbags were introduced inside, along with independent adjustment of the rear seats.

Flying Spur
The 1994–1995 Flying Spur was a turbocharged, higher performance version of the Silver Spur III. 134 cars were produced.

Silver Dawn
The Silver Dawn is a special edition of the Silver Spur III with several additional options, such as Electronic Traction Assistance System and rear seat heaters. The new front was later inherited by the Mark IV series. This model appeared one year earlier on the American market before becoming available to the rest of the world.

Mark IV

Designed in the autumn of 1992, the New Silver Spirit/New Silver Spur was the final revision of the Silver Spirit and Silver Spur, introduced late in 1995 as a 1996-year model.

A marketing decision had been made that the cars should not get a "series IV" designation because the number four is a homonym for death in some Far Eastern languages.

Major changes included the introduction of a Garrett turbocharger on all models and the replacement of the previous Bosch engine management systems with one by Zytec. Also new were updated integrated front and rear bumpers and sixteen-inch wheels. As of 1997, the long wheelbase became standard, with limousine models offered in extra-long only. Inside, a wooden column running down the centre of the dashboard was added.

Silver Spirit production ended during the 1997 model year , although vehicles continued to be produced through 2000 to use up Silver Spirit bodies and parts remaining in stock.

Park Ward Limousine

The Rolls-Royce Park Ward Limousine is a limited edition Silver Spur/Spirit mark IV with a  extended wheelbase and a  taller roof. The Park Ward replaced the Silver Spur/Spirit Touring Limousine. In the middle of the 1998 model year the name was changed to Rolls-Royce Silver Spur Park Ward. The model nomenclature on the badge on the rear of the car says Park Ward. Standard equipment on this model included a bar cabinet with crystal decanters and goblets, intercom, an electrically operated division and a backseat sunroof.

The Rolls-Royce Park Ward Limousine should not be confused with succeeding stretched Rolls-Royce Silver Seraph Park Ward, which was based on the car that replaced the Silver Spirit and was available from 2000–2002.

Touring limousines
Rolls-Royce touring limousines were built to a Robert Jankel design in cooperation with coach builder Mulliner Park Ward, London.

The first Silver Spur Limousine was produced in 1982. 16 cars had the  extended wheelbase, and 84 cars with  extended wheelbase were produced in 1984 and later. One car had a  wheelbase extension. These cars were extended at the B-pillar, between the front and rear doors.

From 1991 on, 99 units of the Touring Limousine with  wheelbase extension were produced. The car was lengthened at the C-pillar with an opera window added. Like these earlier models, most of the cars had fold-down occasional seats in the rear passenger area.

The Park Ward Limousine was the last one to be officially extended (again at the C-pillar) with 70 vehicles produced from 1996 to 1999.

Production
Years are the model years based on the VIN (not the years of manufacturing).

Mark I 
 1980–1989 Silver Spirit: 8126
 1980–1989 Silver Spur: 6240
 1985 Silver Spur Centenary: 26
 1982–1985 Silver Spur Extended : 16
 1984 Silver Spur Extended : 1
 1984–1988 Silver Spur Extended : 84

Mark II 
 1989–1993 Silver Spirit II: 1152
 1990–1993 Silver Spur II: 1658
 1990–1991 Mulliner Spur: 71
 1992–1993 Silver Spur II Touring Limousine: 56

Mark III 
 1994–1995 Silver Spirit III: 234
 1994–1995 Silver Spur III: 465
 1994–1995 Silver Spur III Touring Limousine: 36
 1995 Flying Spur: 134
 1995–1998 Silver Dawn: 237
 1996, 1998 Silver Spur Touring Limousine: 9

Mark IV 
 1996–1997 New Silver Spirit: 145
 1996–2000 New Silver Spur: 802
 1996–1999 Park Ward Limousine: 49
 1997–1998 Touring Limousine Extended : 3
 1997–1999 Silver Spur Division: 38
 1998 Silver Spur Non-Division: 20

References

External links
 Rolls-Royce Silver Spirit

Silver Spirit
Rear-wheel-drive vehicles
Full-size vehicles
Sedans
1980s cars
1990s cars
Limousines